Androstenedione may refer to:

 4-Androstenedione (androst-4-ene-3,17-dione) – an endogenous weak androgen and estrogen and intermediate to/prohormone of testosterone
 5-Androstenedione (androst-5-ene-3,17-dione) – a prohormone of testosterone and hence an anabolic-androgenic steroid
 1-Androstenedione (5α-androst-1-ene-3,17-dione) – a prohormone of 1-testosterone (Δ1-) and hence an anabolic-androgenic steroid

See also
 Androstanedione
 Androstenediol
 Dehydroepiandrosterone
 Androstenolone
 Androstanediol

Androstanes
Human female endocrine system
World Anti-Doping Agency prohibited substances